Heliorestis acidaminivorans is an obligate anaerobic bacterium from the genus of Heliorestis which has been isolated from lake sediments from the Lake El Hamra from Wadi El Natrun in Egypt.

References

External links
Type strain of Heliorestis acidaminivorans at BacDive -  the Bacterial Diversity Metadatabase

Eubacteriales
Bacteria described in 2012